A tuxedo is a type of semi-formal dress for men.

Tuxedo may also refer to:

Places
Canada
 Tuxedo, Winnipeg, Manitoba, a city neighbourhood
 Tuxedo (electoral district), a provincial electoral district in Manitoba
 Tuxedo Park, Calgary, Alberta, a city neighbourhood

United States
 Tuxedo, Maryland, an unincorporated community
 Tuxedo, North Carolina
 Tuxedo, New York, a town
 Tuxedo (Metro-North station)
 Tuxedo Park, New York, a town
Tuxedo Club, a social club located in the town

Others
 Tuxedo, a funk duo consisting of singer Mayer Hawthorne and producer Jake One which has been active since 2015.
 Tuxedo (software), a middleware platform to manage distributed transaction processing
 TUXEDO Computers, a German manufacturer of Linux-compatible computers
 The Tuxedo, a Jackie Chan movie
 Tuxedo (vaudeville), an 1891 vaudeville show 
 Tuxedo (bug), a genus of true bugs in the family Miridae
 Tuxedo cat, a coat pattern in bicolor cats
 Tuxedo,  a dog coat pattern
 Tuxedo mousse cake
 Tuxedos (EP), an EP by Cold War Kids

See also
 Tuxedo Park (disambiguation)
 "Tuxedo Junction", well-known swing era song
 Tuxedo Mask, a fictional character from the Sailor Moon franchise